Austin Ernst (born January 31, 1992) is an American professional golfer on the LPGA Tour.

Amateur career
Ernst was born in Greenville, South Carolina. She played two years for the LSU Tigers, where she won three events including the individual 2011 NCAA Division I Championship.

Professional career
In 2014, Ernst won the Portland Classic on the first playoff hole over In-Kyung Kim.

In August 2020, Ernst won the Walmart NW Arkansas Championship, for her second LPGA Tour title. In the final round, she shot 8-under 63 for a two-stroke victory over Anna Nordqvist.

Amateur wins
2011 NCAA Division I Championship
2012 North and South Women's Amateur

Professional wins (3)

LPGA Tour (3)

LPGA Tour playoff record (1–0)

Results in LPGA majors
Results not in chronological order before 2019.

LA = Low amateur
CUT = missed the half-way cut
NT = no tournament
T = tied

Summary

Most consecutive cuts made – 5 (2020 Evian – 2021 PGA)
Longest streak of top-10s – 1 (three times)

U.S. national team appearances
Amateur
Spirit International Amateur: 2011 (winners)
Curtis Cup: 2012
Espirito Santo Trophy: 2012

Professional
Solheim Cup: 2017 (winners), 2021

Solheim Cup record

References

External links
Austin Ernst personal website

LSU Lady Tigers profile

American female golfers
LSU Lady Tigers golfers
LPGA Tour golfers
Solheim Cup competitors for the United States
Sportspeople from Greenville, South Carolina
1992 births
Living people